Perserikatan is a term that commonly refers to national amateur football competitions in Indonesia held between 1931 and 1994 before the formation of Liga Indonesia, organized by the PSSI, the Indonesian football federation. The competition involved hundreds clubs in Indonesia and was divided into several levels.

In English, the term Perserikatan may literally translate to inter-association football championship as this competition involved all regional-level football associations in Indonesia.

Since 1979, in parallel, another national football league, Galatama (The Premier League), was established for semi professional football clubs. Therefore, prior to 1994, when both Perserikatan and Galatama were merged into a new system called Liga Indonesia, both competitions existed in parallel.

History 
The competition was started on April 19, 1930. Some of Dutch East Indies prominent football club, like VIJ Jakarta, BIVB Bandung, IVBM Magelang, MVB Makassar, SIVB Surabaya and VVB Solo, met and discuss about the future championship on the Netherlands territory. They met at Societeit Hadiprojo, Yogyakarta.

After the meeting, it was agreed that these clubs would found Persatoean Sepak Raga Seloeroeh Indonesia, the parent organization for the teams.

Before Perserikatan was held, the official nationwide football tournament was held by the Nederlands Indische Voetbal Bond, a football association consisting of Dutch people only. The tournament was Netherlands East Indies Inter-City Championship, which started on 1914.

From 1951 to 1979, Perserikatan was officially named as the Kejurnas PSSI (PSSI National Championship). From 1980 to 1994, it was referred to as Divisi Utama PSSI (PSSI Premier Division). In 1994, after being held for approximately 60 seasons (with some breaks in between, such as during the Japanese occupation of Indonesia and Indonesian National Revolution periods), it was merged with Galatama to form new fully professional league, the Liga Indonesia.

List of champions 

Source:

Notes

References

Works cited

External links 
Official website of Liga Indonesia  
Official website of PSSI  
List of Indonesian Football Champions  

 
Defunct football leagues in Indonesia
Indo